The women's 1000 metres competition at the 2018 European Speed Skating Championships was held on 6 January 2018.

Results
The race was started at 14:45.

References

Women's 1000 metres